Raimo Aas (born 18 June 1953 in Tallinn) is an Estonian humorist.

Radio career 
Raimo Aas performed together with Margus Lepa in the Sunday morning radio programme Meelejahutaja for several years.

Performance prohibition 
Aas was subject to a six-month Soviet prohibition of public performance for singing, on the tune of Pust' vsegda budet solnce (Russian for "May there always be sunshine"), lyrics that can be translated as "May there always be sunshine, may there always be smoked sausages".  The performance was deemed as insulting to Soviet youth.

Awards 
In 1999, Raimo Aas was awarded the Meie Mats award for lifelong work in humour.

1953 births
Recipients of Meie Mats
Estonian humorists
Estonian radio personalities
Censorship in the Soviet Union
People from Tallinn
Living people
Tallinn University alumni